Joe Affrunti (born August 1, 1981) is an American professional golfer. 

Affrunti turned professional in 2004. He joined the Nationwide Tour in 2010, and earned his 2011 PGA Tour card by finishing 22nd on the money list, with two runner-up finishes. However, a shoulder injury prevented him from playing any events in his debut season beyond April.

Amateur wins
2000 Chicago District Amateur Championship
2001 Chicago District Amateur Championship

Professional wins (3)
2004 Illinois Open
2009 The Kandy Waters Memorial Classic, Southern Dunes Winter Series (both NGA Hooters Tour)

Playoff record
Web.com Tour playoff record (0–2)

See also
2010 Nationwide Tour graduates

References

External links

American male golfers
Minnesota Golden Gophers men's golfers
Illinois Fighting Illini men's golfers
PGA Tour golfers
Korn Ferry Tour graduates
Golfers from Chicago
People from Crystal Lake, Illinois
1981 births
Living people